Fourier is a lunar impact crater that is located in the southwestern part of the Moon's near side, just to the southeast of the crater Vieta. To the northeast is the Mare Humorum. The rim of this crater is roughly circular, but appears oval when viewed from the Earth due to foreshortening.

Except to the north-northwest, the outer rim is not heavily eroded. The satellite crater Fourier B lies along the eastern rim and inner side. The inner wall is relatively wide, and is slumped slightly along the edge forming a shelf near the perimeter. The interior floor is just over half the diameter of the crater rim, and is relatively level with a small crater to the west of the midpoint and another near the northeast edge.

Satellite craters
By convention these features are identified on lunar maps by placing the letter on the side of the crater midpoint that is closest to Fourier.

References

 
 
 
 
 
 
 
 
 
 
 
 

Impact craters on the Moon